Philip Stainton (9 April 1908 – 1 August 1961) was an English actor. Stainton appeared in several Ealing comedies and major international movies. He specialized in playing friendly or exasperated uniformed policemen, but also appeared  in other comic and straight roles in British and Australian productions.

After beginning in repertory, in the postwar years he worked steadily in bit and featured parts in theatrical films; twice being directed by John Ford and once by John Huston when they shot on European or overseas locations. He first visited Australia as part of a touring company presenting Agatha Christie’s play  Witness for the Prosecution.

Stainton and his actress wife immigrated to Australia in the late 1950s to appear in a series of live television plays as the medium was beginning in that country. From 1957 to 1959 he had the distinction to headline the first Australian sitcom Take That which was broadcast in Melbourne by HSV-7.

He also adapted and produced a version of the gaslight melodrama East Lynne which became a hit around the circuit of surviving music hall venues in the early 1960s and was subsequently revived. During a centenary performance at impresario George Miller's Bowl Music Hall (basement of The Capitol, Melbourne), he succumbed to a heart attack on 1 August 1961.

Filmography

 Eyes That Kill (1947) 
 Night Beat (1947) - Sgt. Black (uncredited)
 Scott of the Antarctic (1948) - Second Questioner
 The Blue Lagoon (1949) - Mr. Ansty
 Passport to Pimlico (1949) - P.C.Spiller
 Poet's Pub (1949) - Mr. Lott (uncredited)
 Don't Ever Leave Me (1949) - Detective Inspector
 Trottie True (1949) - Arthur Briggs (uncredited)
 The Spider and the Fly (1949) - Café Manager
 Boys in Brown (1949) - Principal Prison Officer
 The Elusive Pimpernel (1950) - Jellyband
 White Corridors (1951) - Sawyer
 Appointment with Venus (1951) - Constable
 Angels One Five (1952) - Police Constable
 The Quiet Man (1952) - Anglican Bishop (uncredited)
 Made in Heaven (1952) - Stanley Grimes
 Monsoon (1952) - Putsi
 Innocents in Paris (1953) - Nobby Clarke
 Mogambo (1953) - John Brown-Pryce
 Hobson's Choice (1954) - Denton
 Forbidden Cargo (1954) - Seaburyness Police Sergeant (uncredited)
 Isn't Life Wonderful! (1953) - Dr. Mason
 Up to His Neck (1954) - Mr. Woo
 John and Julie (1955) - London Police Sergeant
 The Woman for Joe (1955) - Sullivan
 Cast a Dark Shadow (1955) - Charlie Man
 The Ladykillers (1955) - The Sergeant
 Who Done It? (1956) - Jimmy Maddox, Frankie's Agent
 Moby Dick (1956) - Bildad
 Reach for the Sky (1956) - Police Constable

References

External links

1908 births
1961 deaths
20th-century English male actors
English male film actors
English male television actors
Male actors from Worcestershire
People from Kings Norton